Bruniales is a valid botanic name at the rank of order. Until recently it was not in use, but a 2008 study suggested that Bruniaceae and Columelliaceae are sister clades. The latest revision of the APG system, APG III, places both families as the only members of the order Bruniales, which is sister to the Apiales, and one of the asterid taxa.

The APG III phylogenetic tree for the asterids is:

References

 
Angiosperm orders